Buyeo Mokdo (目圖王, ? – ?) was a prince of Baekje, one of the Three Kingdoms of Korea. He was the grandson of Seong of Baekje. According to the Shinsen Shōjiroku he settled in Japan and became ancestor of the Oka no muraji clan (岡連氏).

Family
Father: 3rd son of the 26th King, Seong of Baekje
 Mokdo (目圖王, ?–?) - grandson of King Seong, the Japanese reading of his name is "Mokuto". He is ancestor of the Oka no muraji clan (岡連氏).
 Son: Oka no muraji no Anki (岡連安貴, ?–?) - known in Baekje as Angwi.

See also 
 Seong of Baekje
 Gwisil
 Gwisil Boksin
 Gwisil Jipsa
 History of Korea
 Three Kingdoms of Korea
 List of Monarchs of Korea

Notes 

Year of birth missing
Baekje
Korean princes
Korean exiles
Year of death unknown